Edwin James may refer to:

 Edwin James (barrister) (c. 1812–1882), English lawyer, Member of Parliament and would-be actor
 Edwin James (scientist) (1797–1861), American botanist, geographer, geologist and explorer
 Edwin Leland James (1890–1951), American newspaper editor
 Edwin James (footballer) (1869–?), Welsh footballer
 E. O. James (1888–1972), anthropologist in the field of comparative religion
 Eddy James (1874–1937), Australian rules footballer

See also